Crampton is an English surname, from Crompton, Lancashire, which may refer to the following persons:

 Albert M. Crampton (1900–1953), American jurist
 Barbara Crampton (born 1959), American actress
 Bruce Crampton (born 1935), Australian golfer
 Gertrude Crampton (born 1905), American author
 Henry Crampton (1875–1956), American paleontologist and evolutionary biologist
 Howard Crampton (1865–1922), American actor
 Sir John Crampton, 2nd Baronet (1805–1886), British diplomat
 John Crampton (1921–2010) English aviator
 Julian Crampton (d. 2019), British biologist and academic
 Mark Crampton, English journalist and historian
 Matthew Crampton (born 1986), English cyclist
 Peter Crampton (politician) (1932–2011), English politician
 Peter Crampton (athlete) (born 1969), British sprinter
 Robert Crampton (born 1964), English journalist
 Thomas Russell Crampton (1816–1888), English engineer
 William Crampton, British vexillologist
 William Crampton Library

Also:
 Barbara Mary Crampton Pym, novelist
 Crampton Hodnet, a novel by Barbara Pym
 Duncan Stuart Crampton Bell
 Philip Crampton Smyly
 William Crampton Gore

See also
The following locations:
 Crampton's Gap
 Battle of Crampton's Gap
 Crampton Island
 Crampton, Ontario, a community in Thames Centre

Other:
 Crampton locomotive
 6-2-0 locomotive (American usage)
 G&T Crampton, Irish construction company

Surnames
Surnames of Old English origin
English toponymic surnames